Adrián Woll (December 2, 1795 – February 1875) was a French Mexican general in the army of Mexico during the Texas Revolution and the military conflict between Mexico and the Republic of Texas which followed.

Woll was governor of Tamaulipas from May 2, 1853, to January 28, 1855, and had a second term from April 4, 1855, to September 8, 1855.

See also

Antonio López de Santa Anna
Mexican War of Independence
Republic of the Rio Grande

References
The Second Mexican-Texas War, Hill Junior College Monograph, Texian Press, Waco, TX, 1972.
His archives are kept by the French ministry of Foreign affairs (180PAAP)

External links
 Handbook of Texas On-line

Governors of Tamaulipas
People of Mexican side in the Texas Revolution
French military personnel of the Napoleonic Wars
Mexican military personnel of the Mexican–American War
Mexican generals
1795 births
1875 deaths
Mexican invasions of 1842
Mexican monarchists